Norwood Football Club, nicknamed the Redlegs, is an Australian rules football club competing in the South Australian National Football League (SANFL) in the state of South Australia. Its home ground is Coopers Stadium (Norwood Oval), which is often referred to as "The Parade". It is one of the two traditional powerhouse clubs of the SANFL, the other being Port Adelaide, who together have won half of all SANFL premierships (see Port Adelaide–Norwood SANFL rivalry). The club has won 31 SANFL premierships and 1 SANFLW premiership.

History

1878–1899: Nineteenth-century powerhouse

The Norwood Football Club was formed at a meeting held at the Norfolk Arms Hotel in Rundle Street, Adelaide on 28 February 1878: it was resolved that the club colours would be those of the old Woodville Club. 
At a subsequent meeting with 12 members present at the Norfolk Arms Hotel on 14 March the colours were confirmed as blue guernseys and knickerbockers, and red stockings and cap.
The new club gained a number of leading players from the then recently dissolved Woodville Football Club (1868–1877), including its Captain J.R. (Joe) Osborn who would become Norwood's inaugural Captain.

Norwood's first home ground was the current CBC College oval in the east Park Lands near the tramway and opposite the Kent Town Brewery.

Norwood played their first match at Adelaide Oval on 16 May 1878 against South Adelaide, who were the reigning premiers: Norwood went on to win the match 1 goal to nil, with Test cricketer George Giffen kicking Norwood's goal from a running kick. During this match the players donned distinctive red stockings which gave rise to the nickname 'Redlegs', the moniker which has remained synonymous with Norwood ever since.

Norwood won a premiership in its first year of existence and then followed with five more in a row. Only Port Adelaide in 1954-1959 has managed to repeat the feat of winning six premierships in a row. Norwood eventually won 11 'pennants' between 1878 and 1899 and was the most successful team of the 19th century. In 1883, after winning the pennant for the sixth successive year, Norwood became the first South Australian club to record a win over a Victorian team, when it defeated Essendon. In 1888, Norwood were proclaimed 'Premiers of Australia' when they defeated South Melbourne in three matches at Kensington Oval.

Norwood and Port Adelaide became famous rivals after a particularly tough match in 1894.

Early champions of the club include Alfred 'Topsy' Waldron, who captained the club for nine years, Alby Green, the first player to win the Magarey Medal for the best and fairest player in the competition in 1898, and Anthony 'Bos' Daly, who kicked 88 goals in 1893 including an astonishing 23 goals in one match. Daly's goal tally would not be surpassed for another 37 years, and his tally of 23 goals in one match has only ever been equalled by the great North Adelaide goal shooter, Ken Farmer. Daly was widely regarded as "the greatest South Australian footballer from 1877 to the close of the nineteenth century".

1900–1915: pre-WWI era

The 1904 Grand Final was a memorable one for Norwood who were down by 35 points at three-quarter time against traditional rival Port Adelaide. Norwood then produced an extraordinary burst of football with a goal by centre half forward Dean Dawson followed by two goals each from full forward, Bill Miller and half forward flanker, Stan Robinson. Norwood was only two points down with a minute remaining. Tommy Gibbons held a mark on a seemingly impossible angle.  His kick sailed through the goal posts to give Norwood a four-point victory 9.8 to 8.10.

Norwood were proclaimed the Champions of Australia again in 1907 when they defeated the Victorian premier, Carlton, 13.12 to 8.9 after Norwood scored 7 goals in the first 20 minutes of the third quarter. Norwood would beat Carlton again in 1921, but on this latter occasion both clubs were runners up in their respective competitions.

1919–1944: Interwar period and WWII competition

1922–1924: Thomas Leahy success
For his brief coaching stint, Thomas Leahy proved remarkably successful, leading the Redlegs to back to back premierships in 1922 and 1923, a feat that would not be repeated for 90 years.

1925–1929: Walter Scott era
Walter Scott was captain-coach of the Norwood Football Club for five years, leading his team to two grand finals in 1928 and 1929, winning the latter against Port Adelaide.

1945–1956: Jack Oatey era
Over a coaching stint of 12 years, Jack Oatey led the Redlegs to three premierships in 1946, 1948, 1950.

1957–1973: Premiership drought
The period spanning the 1951 and 1973 seasons, totalling twenty three years, was the club's longest without a premiership.

1974–1979: Robert Hammond era

1977: NFL night series premiers

Robert Hammond would lead the Redlegs to two premierships, one in 1975 and the other in 1978.

In 1977, Norwood defeated East Perth for the NFL night series premiership. Both of these clubs would later make bids to enter the VFL, East Perth in 1980 and Norwood in 1986. Norwood would go on to win the game 10.9 (69) to East Perth's 9.7 (61). This would be Norwood's third and last title in a national competition. Norwood were awarded $50,000 for their win.

1978: 100 years of the Norwood Football Club

1978 was Norwood's centenary year and Sturt, heading into the grand final, had lost only one game for the year and was odds-on favourite to win its 8th flag in 13 years. Norwood was 29 points down at three-quarter time but scored seven goals to Sturt's two in the last quarter to win the premiership by one point. Memorable moments in the match include Neil Button's effort in ruck against Sturt's Rick Davies, John Wynne's charge into the Sturt coaches box, Michael Taylor's mark 1 metre out from Sturt's goal with a minute to go, Danny Jenkin's leaping smother of a shot for goal with just seconds left to play and Brian Adamson's five goals from centre half forward. However, the most controversial moment was when field umpire Des Foster awarded a mark to Norwood’s Phil Gallagher in the dying seconds of the final quarter, that resulted in a goal by Gallagher which gave Norwood a 1 point lead that would hold to the final siren.

1980–1990: Neil Balme era
Under the leadership of Western Australian Neil Balme, the Redlegs won two premierships, one in 1982 and a second in 1984. The 1984 premiership was notable as the side came from 5th position at the end of the minor round to win the Grand Final, the first time a team outside the top four had won the competition. Two distinguished Norwood players from this era are Michael Aish and Garry McIntosh.

1991–1997: National League expansion

1991–1995: Neil Craig era
With the formation of the Adelaide Crows, the number of the SANFL's best players leaving the competition skyrocketed. The Norwood Football Club was hit particularly hard just avoiding the wooden spoon in successive years. However to the credit of Neil Craig, he managed to make do with what was at his disposal and in his third year as senior Redlegs coach the side made the 1993 Grand Final. However, timing was to be unfortunate and the Redlegs found themselves up against the recently created Woodville-West Torrens Eagles who were by far the strongest team of the year, losing by a club record 73 points.

1996–1999: Peter Rohde era

 The Norwood Football Club entered the 1997 SANFL season with purpose and rage that would see it dominate the years competition. During the home and away season the club lost only three games during the minor round with a percentage of 64.82%, second to only that of Port Adelaide's 1914 season percentage of 68.78%. The dominance of Norwood during this year was highlighted on ANZAC day when Norwood played the second placed team of the year, Port Adelaide, winning by 122 points. However, during the second semi-final Norwood lost to Port Adelaide. The loss proved to be a wake up call for a side seemingly winning with ease.
 The following week a win over Central District saw them make the Grand Final, where again they would play Port Adelaide, this time in front of 44,161 eager spectators. Norwood were no longer complacent like they had been a couple weeks ago and dished out Port Adelaide's greatest ever grand final defeat in the SANFL winning by 73 points, 19.12 (126) to 7.11 (53). With midfielders Anthony Harvey (Jack Oatey Medallist), John Cunningham and Andrew Jarman playing superbly, the Redlegs had their Magpie opponents chasing shadows all afternoon. Norwood's victory, which came during the same season Port Adelaide's controversial bid to enter the AFL came to fruition, meant the satisfaction it generated amongst Redleg supporters was euphoric.

2000–2009: Tough times
The euphoria of the 1997 grand final victory would be short lived with the club only making it to another grand final once in the next decade, losing to Port Adelaide. The decade would see club revenue reduced to its minimum extent as the AFL took an economic hold of football in the state. During this time the club picked up only its 6th wooden spoon and its first for over three decades.

2010–2013: Nathan Bassett and Norwood resurgence
Norwood won their 28th and 29th SANFL premierships in 2012 and 2013 by defeating West Adelaide and North Adelaide respectively and lost only five minor round games over those two years (two in 2012, three in 2013). It was the first time in 90 years (1922 and 1923) that the club had won back-to-back premierships. By coincidence, Norwood defeated Wests in 1922 and North in 1923.

2014–2016: Ben Warren as coach

 
In his first season as coach Ben Warren, with recruiting restrictions due to a salary cap breach and the loss of 12 premiership players, managed to guide the club to a Grand Final, in which Norwood defeated its biggest rival by 4 points, Norwood 12.10 (82) Port Adelaide 11.12 (78), in front of the largest Grand Final crowd for 15 years of 38,644. The win was significant given that the Port Adelaide team of 21 included 19 full-time professional AFL-listed players. It was also Norwood's 30th premiership, and completed a hat-trick following on from its 2012 and 2013 flags. The victory left Norwood as the team that won both the last Grand Final at Football Park and the first Grand Final at the newly refurbished Adelaide Oval.

In 2015, Norwood started the season 9–1 despite losing their captain Kieran McGuinness to retirement along with Gavin Hughes over the off-season, Anthony Wilson to the Adelaide Crows and Steven Baldasso suffering a season ending knee injury during the pre-season. The Redlegs were top of the ladder after Round 10 but a loss to bottom side Glenelg in round 11 would prove pivotal as they fell away in the second half of the season to only win 2 of their remaining 9 games with an horrific run of injuries to key players. They finished 4th after the minor round with 11–7, equal third with West Adelaide, but with inferior percentage were sent to an Elimination Final and were bundled out by 44 points by Central District.

2016 season saw the Redlegs regain Andrew Kirwan from overseas, Matt Fuller, Anthony Wilson and Jaryd Cachia from AFL duties but this did not cover the losses of James Allan, Michael Newton, Liam Davis and Mat Suckling, all to retirement, with Andrew McInnes and Mitch Wilkins returning to Melbourne after only one year and Kane Murphy returning to Sydney. The Redlegs started well with a win over archrivals, Port Adelaide, at Coopers Stadium by 25 points with Simon Phillips copping a season ending shoulder injury. A shock loss to North Adelaide by 57 points was the start of things to come as the Redlegs struggled with many injuries throughout the year which started with Michael Chippendale missing for the first six weeks and then significant injuries to key players in Bode, Panos, Cachia, Phillips and Webber throughout the year saw the Redlegs struggle without their star players. Norwood managed to win three of their last six games of the season with a shock win over ladder leaders, Woodville-West Torrens, by 24 points at Coopers Stadium which was the Redlegs stand out game in a poor season. This led to the departure of their Senior Coach, Ben Warren, with both parties not being able to come to an agreement over the club's future. Ben Warren ended with a win–loss record of 31–27.

2017–present: Evolution
Norwood were a foundation member of the SANFL Women's (SANFLW) competition in 2017. They claimed their first (and currently only) premiership in the competition in the inaugural 2017 season.

Tradition

The Norwood Football Club is one of two traditional power-house clubs in the South Australian National Football League, the other team being the Port Adelaide Football Club. As a result, their rivalry was the biggest in South Australian sport for over 100 years before the arrival of the Showdown. The two clubs still consistently attract the largest crowds during the SANFL minor round.

Current club song

It's a grand old flag

1878 club song

Men of Norwood

Famous supporters 
 Donald Dunstan (Premier)
 Paul Kelly (musician)
 Sandy Roberts (television broadcaster)
 Bruce McAvaney (sports broadcaster)
 Angela Pippos (television broadcaster)
 Greg Champion (songwriter)
 Jim Keays (musician)

Home grounds
The current home ground for the Norwood Football Club is Norwood Oval. It has been the club's home since 1901 and under current naming rights it is referred to as 'Coopers Stadium'.
East Parklands (1878–82)
Kensington Oval (1882–1897)
Jubilee Oval (1898–1900)
Norwood Oval (1901–present)

Current playing list

 

 (c)

|Coach = Jade Rawlings
|Senior Assistant = Rob Harding
|Assistant = James Saywell

AFL/VFL players (including Rookies)
There is a list of past and present Norwood players who have played at AFL/VFL:

Matthew Ahmat (Brisbane Bears and Sydney Swans)
James Aish (Brisbane Lions, Collingwood, and Fremantle)
David Armour (Geelong)
Craig Balme (Richmond)
Neil Balme (Richmond)
Nathan Bassett (Adelaide)
Scott Bassett (Port Adelaide and Western Bulldogs)
Thomas Beacham (1878–1947) (Fitzroy)
Percy Bice (1915–1985) (Richmond)
Dave Bland (1929–2013) (St Kilda)
Jace Bode (Melbourne)
Stuart Bown (Adelaide)
Peter Brenchley (1936–1991) (Melbourne)
Ian Brewer (1936–2010) (Collingwood)
Luke Brown (Adelaide)
Les Bryant (1896–1965) (Fitzroy)
Mark Buckley (Carlton, St Kilda and Brisbane Bears)
Jaryd Cachia (Carlton)
Bryce Campbell (Adelaide)
Phil Carman (Collingwood, Melbourne, Essendon and North Melbourne)
Harry Clapson (1895–1987) (North Melbourne)
Adam Cockshell (Port Adelaide)
Sudjai Cook (Adelaide)
Jarrod Cotton (Port Adelaide)
Jared Crouch (Sydney Swans)
Heath Culpitt (Carlton)
John Cunningham (Geelong)
Clarrie Curyer (1912–2003) (St Kilda)
Peter Dalwood (1922–2000) (Fitzroy)
Donald Dickie (Port Adelaide)
Ross Dillon (Melbourne)
Scott Direen (Sydney Swans)
Nick Duigan (Carlton)
Trent Dumont (North Melbourne)
Graeme Dunstan (Collingwood)
Nathan Eagleton (Port Adelaide and Western Bulldogs)
Simon Eastaugh (Essendon and Fremantle)
Orazio Fantasia (Essendon)
Geoff Feehan (St Kilda)
Jeff Fehring (1955–2008) (Geelong and St Kilda)
Dale Fleming (Fitzroy)
Alex Forster (Fremantle)
Nic Fosdike (Sydney Swans)
Tony Francis (Collingwood and St Kilda)
James Gallagher (Adelaide)
Alex Georgiou (Melbourne)
Art Gilchrist (1879–1947) (Melbourne)
Daniel Gorringe (Gold Coast and Carlton)
Mitch Grigg (Adelaide)

Kevin Hardiman (1915–2002) (Essendon)
Reg Harley (1925–2014) (South Melbourne)
Tom Hart (1896–1971) (Carlton)
Anthony Harvey (St Kilda)
Tim Hazell (Hawthorn)
Neil Hein (Brisbane Bears)
Martin Heppell (St Kilda and Melbourne)
Adam Heuskes (Sydney Swans, Port Adelaide and Brisbane Lions)
Andrew Hill (Collingwood)
Ron Hoy (Hawthorn)
Nathon Irvin (Sydney Swans)
Brett James (Collingwood and Adelaide)
Roger James (Port Adelaide)
Andrew Jarman (Adelaide)
Tom Jonas (Port Adelaide)
Aaron Keating (Adelaide)
Tony Keenan (Collingwood)
Craig Kelly (Collingwood)
Matthew Kelly (Adelaide)
Bob Kingston (South Melbourne)
Brenton Klaebe (Fitzroy)
Ed Lower (North Melbourne)
Nick Lower (Port Adelaide, Fremantle and Western Bulldogs)
Stuart Mangin (Collingwood)
Kris Massie (Carlton and Adelaide)
Rodney Maynard (Adelaide)
Paul McCormack (Carlton)
Kieran McGuinness (Western Bulldogs)
Andrew McInnes (Carlton)
Bob McLean (1914–1989) (St Kilda)
John Meesen (Adelaide and Melbourne)
Algy Millhouse (1887–1948) (Melbourne and St Kilda)
Will Minson (Western Bulldogs)
Danny Morton (Fitzroy and Port Adelaide)
Glenn Molloy (Melbourne)
Graham Molloy (Melbourne)
Robert Neill (Sydney Swans and St Kilda)
John Nelson (St Kilda)
Michael Newton (Melbourne)
Mick Nunan (Richmond)
Jack Oatey (1920–1994) (South Melbourne)
Cristian O'Brien (Geelong)
David Palm (Richmond)
Greg Parke (Melbourne, Footscray and Fitzroy)
Joel Patfull (Brisbane Lions and GWS)
Stephen Patterson (Collingwood)
Harrison Petty (Melbourne)
Darren Pfeiffer (Carlton and Port Adelaide)

Simon Phillips (Sydney Swans and Port Adelaide)
Martin Pike (Melbourne, Fitzroy, North Melbourne/Kangaroos and Brisbane Lions)
Steven Pitt (Collingwood and Melbourne)
David Pittman (Adelaide)
Matthew Primus (Fitzroy and Port Adelaide)
Paul Puopolo (Hawthorn)
Harry Ralph (1919–2004) (Essendon)
Bert Renfrey (1879–1940) (St Kilda)
Brent Renouf (Hawthorn and Port Adelaide)
Stephen Richardson (Essendon)
Don Roach (1940–2011) (Hawthorn)
Neville Roberts (Richmond)
Jonathon Robran (Hawthorn and Essendon)
Matthew Robran (Hawthorn and Adelaide)
Jonathan Ross (Adelaide)
Lester Ross (St Kilda)
Sam Rowe (Carlton)
Stephen Rowe (Adelaide)
Kym Russell (Collingwood)
Glenn Sandford (Collingwood)
Albert Sawley (1915–1983) (St Kilda)
Gordon Sawley (1913–1942) (South Melbourne)
Ryan Schoenmakers (Hawthorn)
Robert Semmens (Richmond and Footscray)
Jack Sexton (1900–1935) (Fitzroy)
Cameron Shenton (St Kilda)
Sam Smart (Carlton)
Geoff Smith (Hawthorn)
Nick Smith (Melbourne)
Ben Speight (North Melbourne)
Justin Staritski (North Melbourne and Collingwood)
Phil Stephens (1935–2015) (St Kilda)
Grant Tanner (Geelong)
Jim Taylor (1932–2000) (South Melbourne)
Michael Taylor (Collingwood)
Dean Terlich (Melbourne)
James Thiessen (Richmond and Adelaide)
Keith Thomas (Fitzroy)
Matt Thomas (Port Adelaide and Richmond)
David Trotter (Kangaroos)
Alfred Waldron (1857–1929) (Carlton)
Tom Warhurst, Jr. (Adelaide)
James Wasley (Collingwood)
Neville Way (St Kilda)
Jim West (Sydney Swans)
Ben Wilson (Collingwood and Sydney Swans)
Austin Wonaeamirri (Melbourne)

Membership and attendance

Honour roll

Signifies SANFL leading goal kicker

Hall of Fame
In 2006, the Norwood Football Club board wrote a charter to establish a club Hall of Fame and Hall of Fame Committee, with the express purpose of "recognis[ing] and enshrin[ing] players, coaches, volunteers, honorary officials and administrators who have made a most significant contribution to the Norwood Football Club since its inception in 1878." The Hall of Fame Committee were tasked with selecting a maximum of 30 members for the inaugural induction ceremony, with up to 25 players and up to five coaches, volunteers, honorary officials or administrators from across the broad history of Norwood. Like other SANFL clubs, the charter initially adopted the practice of using broad historical eras to categorize members; in the case of Norwood, five eras were outlined: a) 1878 to 1906; b) 1907 to 1941; c) 1946 to 1969; d) 1970 to 1990; and e) 1991 and onwards. The Committee were also tasked with expanding the Hall of Fame by admitting up to five new members each year. There are currently 63 members in the Norwood Hall of Fame. In 2018, five of those members were upgraded to Legend status. The categorization below follows that of the club's history website, Redlegs Museum.

 Members with names in bold are also in the South Australian Football Hall of Fame
 Members with an asterisk* next to their names are also in the Australian Football Hall of Fame

Team of the century

Club achievements

Individual awards

Magarey Medallists
1898 – Alby Green
1915 – Charlie Perry
1921 – Walter Scott 
1924 – Walter Scott
1925 – Alick Lill
1930 – Walter Scott
1936 – Bill McCallum
1951 – John Marriott
1966 – Ron Kneebone
1981 – Michael Aish
1994 – Garry McIntosh 
1995 – Garry McIntosh
1997 – Andrew Jarman 
2013 – Matt Thomas
2017 – Mitch Grigg
2018 – Mitch Grigg

Fos Williams Medallists
 1983 – Michael Aish
 1984 – Garry McIntosh
 1990 – Andrew Jarman
 1992 – Garry McIntosh
 1994 – Scott Burns
 1995 – Garry McIntosh
 1997 – James Thiessen
 1998 – Paul McCormack
 1999 – Anthony Harvey
 2005 – Scott Borlace

Jack Oatey Medallists
 1982 – Danny Jenkins
 1984 – Keith Thomas
 1997 – John Cunningham
 2012 – Dean Terlich
 2013 – Brett Zorzi
 2014 – Matt Panos
 2018 – Mitch Grigg
 2022 – Harry Boyd

Ken Farmer Medallists
 1997 – Jim West

All-Australians
Sporting Life Magazine
 1947 – Sam Gallagher
 1950 – John Marriott, Doug Olds
 1951 – John Marriott
 1952 – John Marriott
 1954 – John Marriott
 1955 – Jim Taylor, John Marriott
Interstate carnivals
 1953 – John Marriott
 1961 – Kingsley Wedding
 1969 – Graham Molloy
 1983 – Michael Aish
 1986 – Michael Aish (vice-captain)

Club records

Attendances
Coopers Stadium: 20,280 v Port Adelaide, 1971 round 8
Adelaide Oval: 58,924 v Port Adelaide, 1957 SANFL Grand Final
AAMI Stadium: 53,283 v Glenelg, 1975 SANFL Grand Final

Most games
 371 – Garry McIntosh (1982–1998)

Most goals in a season
 111 – Neville Roberts (1983)

Most goals
 669 – Bruce Schultz (1933–1941)

Most years as coach
 12 – Jack Oatey (1945–56)

Most premierships as coach
 3 – Jack Oatey (1946, 1948, 1950)

Most years as captain
 9 – Alfred Waldron (1881–84, 1887–90, 1892)
 9 – Garry McIntosh (1990–98)

Most premierships as captain
 6 – Alfred Waldron (1881, 1882, 1883, 1887, 1888, 1889)

Most best and fairest awards
 6 – Walter Scott (1920–21, 1923, 1926, 1928, 1930)
 6 – Michael Taylor (1973–74, 1978–80, 1986)

Highest score
 33.21 (219) v North Adelaide 10.9 (69) at Norwood Oval in Round 6, 1977

Most state games
 39 – Walter Scott, 1920–32

References

External links

 

 
South Australian National Football League clubs
SANFL Women's League
Australian rules football clubs in South Australia
1878 establishments in Australia
Australian rules football clubs established in 1878